Uralla Shire is a local government area located in the New England region of New South Wales, Australia. The New England Highway passes through the Shire.

The Shire was established on 1 January 1948 as a result of the amalgamation of the Municipality of Uralla with the surrounding Gostwyck Shire.
The Mayor of Uralla Shire Council is Cr. Michael Pearce, an independent politician.

Towns and villages 
The towns and villages of Uralla Shire include Uralla, Bundarra, Yarrowyck, Kingstown, Kentucky, Invergowrie and Wollun.

Heritage listings
The Uralla Shire has a number of heritage-listed sites, including:
 Bundarra, Oliver Street: Bundarra Police Station and Courthouse
 Kentucky District: Captain Thunderbolt's Death Site
 Uralla, 6 East Street: New England Brass and Iron Lace Foundry
 Uralla, Main Northern railway: Uralla railway station
 Uralla, Salisbury Street: McCrossins Mill
 Uralla, Uralla Square: Captain Thunderbolt's Grave
 Uralla, New England Highway: Blanch's Royal Oak Inn
 Uralla, New England Highway: Captain Thunderbolt's Rock

Demographics 
According to the Australian Bureau of Statistics there:
were 6,126 people as at 30 June 2006, the 122nd largest Local Government Area in New South Wales.  It was equal to less than 0.1% of the New South Wales population of 6,827,694
was an increase of 56 people over the year to 30 June 2006, the 101st largest population growth in a Local Government Area in New South Wales.  It was equal to 0.1% of the 58,753 increase in the population of New South Wales
was, in percentage terms, an increase of 0.9% in the number of people over the year to 30 June 2006, the 55th fastest growth in population of a Local Government Area in New South Wales.  In New South Wales the population grew by 0.9%
was an increase in population over the 10 years to 30 June 2006 of 78 people or 1.3% (0.1% in annual average terms), the 94th highest rate of a Local Government Area in New South Wales.  In New South Wales the population grew by 622,966 or 10% (1.0% in annual average terms) over the same period.

Incomes
According to the Australian Bureau Statistics during 2003–04, there:
were 1,865 wage and salary earners (ranked 118th in New South Wales and 381st in Australia, less than 0.1% of both New South Wales's 2,558,415 Australia's 7,831,856)
was a total income of around $58 million (ranked 118th in New South Wales and 384th in Australia, less than 0.1% of both New South Wales's $107 billion and Australia's $304 billion)
was an estimated average income per wage and salary earner of $31,071 (ranked 128th in New South Wales and 435th in Australia, 75% of New South Wales's $41,407 and 80% of Australia's $38,820)
was an estimated median income per wage and salary earner of $28,396 (ranked 140th in New South Wales and 461st in Australia, 80% of New South Wales's $35,479 and 83% of Australia's $34,149).

Council

Current composition and election method
Uralla Shire Council is composed of nine Councillors elected proportionally as three separate wards, each electing three Councillors. All Councillors are elected for a fixed four-year term of office. The Mayor is by the Councillors at the first meeting of the council. The most recent election was held on 8 September 2012 and the makeup of the council is as follows:

The current Council, elected in 2012, in order of election by ward, is:

At the 2012 local government elections, a referendum was held to directly elect they Mayor and reduce the number of Wards from three to two, each electing four Councillors. The referendum was passed, with 55.96% voting in favour of the resolution. The changes will take place at the next local government elections, due to be held in 2016.

Proposed amalgamation
A 2015 review of local government boundaries recommended that the Armidale Dumaresq Shire and the Guyra Shire councils merge. An alternative proposal, submitted by the Armidale Dumaresq Council on 1 March 2016, was for an amalgamation of the Armidale Dumaresq, Guyra, Uralla and Walcha councils. The outcome of the independent review is expected by mid–2016.

References

External links

 
Local government areas of New South Wales
New England (New South Wales)
1948 establishments in Australia